Christopher William Hill is a British playwright and children's novelist.

Early life
Christopher William Hill was born in Truro, Cornwall.

Career
His series of children's novels, Tales From Schwartzgarten, is published by Orchard Books,  and comprises Osbert The Avenger (2012), The Woebegone Twins (2013), The Lily-Livered Prince (2014) and Marius And The Band Of Blood (2015). His children's novel, What Manor Of Murder? was published in 2018 by Orchard Books. Osbert The Avenger won the East Sussex Children's Book Award. in 2014, and was shortlisted for the Northern Ireland Book Award (2013–14) and the Leeds Book Award (2014). His plays for the National Theatre's Connections festival are Multiplex and Heartbreak Beautiful. His play Mister Holgado was co-winner of Best Show for Children and Young People at the UK Theatre Awards in 2013 and is published by Oberon Books. His plays for BBC Radio 4 include Killing Maestros (2003), starring Bill Nighy and Henry Goodman, which won the inaugural Tinniswood Award for the best original audio drama script in 2004, Love Me, Liberace (2004), starring Henry Goodman and Frances Barber, Accolades (2007), starring Ian Richardson as the British author and historian A. L. Rowse, Hush! Hush! Whisper Who Dares! (2013), starring Oliver Ford Davies as the British illustrator E H Shepard, and three plays about the writer and architectural historian James Lees-Milne, Sometimes Into The Arms Of God, The Unending Battle and What England Owes. His comedies for BBC Radio 4 include two series of Tomorrow, Today! (2006-2008), Says On The Tin (2008), and two series of On The Rocks (2013-2015). His comedy-drama series, Clutch, Throttle, Brake (2017) for the 15 Minute Drama slot in BBC Radio 4's Woman's Hour programme, starred Bill Paterson, Samantha Spiro and Alison Steadman.

He has contributed to The Guardian and he is a regular tutor at the Arvon Foundation

Selected works

Plays
Lam (Northcott Theatre, Exeter, 1999)
Blood Red, Saffron Yellow (Plymouth Theatre Royal, 2001)
Inglorious Technicolour (Stephen Joseph Theatre, 2006) 
Song Of The Western Men (Minerva Theatre, Chichester, 2002) 
Mister Holgado (Unicorn Theatre, 2013) 
Pinocchio (The Dukes, Lancaster, 2016) 
Clockwork Canaries (Plymouth Theatre Royal, 2018)

Radio drama
Killing Maestros (BBC Radio 4, 2003)
Love Me, Liberace (BBC Radio 4, 2004)
Accolades (BBC Radio 4, 2007)
Angarrack (BBC Radio 4, 2012)
Hush! Hush! Whisper Who Dares! (BBC Radio 4, 2013)
Sometimes Into The Arms Of God (BBC Radio 4, 2013)
The Unending Battle (BBC Radio 4, 2013)
What England Owes (BBC Radio 4, 2013)
Clutch, Throttle, Brake (BBC Radio 4, 2017)

Radio comedy series
Tomorrow, Today! (BBC Radio 4, 2006-2008)
Says On The Tin (BBC Radio 4, (2008)
On The Rocks (BBC Radio 4, (2013-2015)

Children's books
Osbert The Avenger (Orchard Books, 2012)
 The Woebegone Twins (Orchard Books, 2013)
The Lily-Livered Prince (Orchard Books, 2014)
Marius And The Band Of Blood (Orchard Books, 2015)
What Manor Of Murder? (Orchard Books, 2018)

References

External links

Christopher William Hill official website
Tomorrow, Today! at British Comedy Guide
Says On The Tin at British Comedy Guide
On The Rocks at British Comedy Guide

21st-century English male writers
Living people
Year of birth missing (living people)
English children's writers
British male dramatists and playwrights
British children's writers
People from Truro